The Week was a newspaper published in Brisbane, Queensland, Australia. Its masthead described it as "A Journal of Commerce, Farming, Mining & General Information & Amusement".

History
The newspaper was published from 1 January 1876 to 27 June 1934.

Digitisation
The newspaper has been digitised as part of the Trove digitised newspaper collection.

References

External links 

Newspapers published in Brisbane
Defunct newspapers published in Queensland